Harris v. Alabama, 513 U.S. 504 (1995), was a case in which the Supreme Court of the United States held that allowing the judge to impose a death sentence and making the jury recommendation non-binding even when it calls for life imprisonment is constitutional.

See also 
 List of United States Supreme Court decisions on capital punishment

References

United States Supreme Court cases
1995 in United States case law